The 2015 Japanese Championship Super Formula season was the forty-third season of premier Japanese open-wheel motor racing and the third under the name of Super Formula. The season began on 19 April and will end on 8 November after seven rounds.

The 2015 season was also the last season that Bridgestone, who had been the series' only tyre supplier since 1997, supplied tyres to all teams, as Yokohama took over the tyre contract for 2016.

Teams and drivers

Race calendar and results
A provisional calendar for the 2015 season was released on 8 August 2014. All races are scheduled to be held in Japan. To avoid a clash with the 2015 FIA World Endurance Championship season, the date for the first round in Suzuka was rescheduled for 19 April, and to avoid a clash with the 2015 Formula One season, the SUGO race was also rescheduled to 18 October.

Championship standings

Drivers' Championship
Scoring system

Teams' Championship

References

External links
Japanese Championship Super Formula official website 

2015
Super Formula
Super Formula